The Players Tour Championship 2010/2011 – Event 5 (also known as Star Xing Pai Players Tour Championship 2010/2011 – Event 5 for sponsorship purposes) was a professional minor-ranking snooker tournament that took place between 7–10 October 2010 at the World Snooker Academy in Sheffield, England.

Ding Junhui won in the final 4–1 against Jamie Jones.

Prize fund and ranking points
The breakdown of prize money and ranking points of the event is shown below:

1 Only professional players can earn ranking points.

Main draw

Preliminary rounds

Round 1
Best of 7 frames

Round 2
Best of 7 frames

Main rounds

Top half

Section 1

Section 2

Section 3

Section 4

Bottom half

Section 5

Section 6

Section 7

Section 8

Finals

Century breaks

 143  Jamie Jones
 136  Tony Drago
 135, 102  Ricky Walden
 135  Jamie Cope
 134  Noppon Saengkham
 133  Jimmy Robertson
 131  Patrick Wallace
 129  Graeme Dott
 125, 104  Andrew Higginson
 119, 113  Mark Selby
 117  Tian Pengfei
 116  Kuldesh Johal
 116  Ding Junhui
 115, 114, 112  Marco Fu

 115  Alan McManus
 115  Matthew Stevens
 112, 100  Dominic Dale
 110  Robert Milkins
 109  Anthony McGill
 106  Andy Hicks
 106  Michael Holt
 104, 103  Barry Hawkins
 104  Gerard Greene
 103  Justin Astley
 102  Marcus Campbell
 102  Rory McLeod
 102  Mark Joyce
 101  Luca Brecel

References

5
2010 in English sport

sv:Players Tour Championship 2010/2011#Players Tour Championship 5